Benamaurel is a village located in the province of Granada, Spain. According to the 2006 census (INE), the city has a population of 2328 inhabitants. The municipality includes the following localities: Puente Arriba, San Marcos, Cuevas de la Blanca, Huerta Real, Cuevas del Negro y Cuevas de Luna. There is a market held every Sunday morning (mainly from vans that go town-to-town) and a 3-day Moors and Christians festival held in April.

The village contains basic small shops and a number of bars, some of which serve meals (although it's worth checking if they are open during the winter months). There is also a municipal outdoor swimming pool that is open from June through to September.

The nearest large town is Baza, Granada about 20 km south and this is also the route to the main A92N motorway through Granada province to the airports (Granada, Almeria, Murcia and Alicante)

References

Municipalities in the Province of Granada